Alexandroff plank in topology, an area of mathematics, is a topological space that serves as an instructive example.

Definition

The topology  is extended to a topology  by adding the sets of the form

where 

The Alexandroff plank is the topological space 

It is called plank for being constructed from a subspace of the product of two spaces.

Properties

The space  has the following properties:
 It is Urysohn, since  is regular. The space  is not regular, since  is a closed set not containing  while every neighbourhood of  intersects every neighbourhood of 
 It is semiregular, since each basis rectangle in the topology  is a regular open set and so are the sets  defined above with which the topology was expanded.
 It is not countably compact, since the set  has no upper limit point.

See also

References

 Lynn Arthur Steen and J. Arthur Seebach, Jr., Counterexamples in Topology. Springer-Verlag, New York, 1978. Reprinted by Dover Publications, New York, 1995.  (Dover edition).
 S. Watson, The Construction of Topological Spaces. Recent Progress in General Topology, Elsevier, 1992.

Topological spaces